The World Quizzing Championships is an individual quiz contest organised by the International Quizzing Association (the umbrella organisation of various quizzing organisations from more than 25 countries around the world). The competition has been staged annually since  (since 2004 in more than one country simultaneously) with an increasing number of contestants from an increasing number of nations. Since 2006, the competition has been staged on the first Saturday of every June.

As of 2022, Pat Gibson and Jesse Honey, both from England, hold the title for the highest-scoring quizzers with 186 out of 240 total points.

Format
The World Quizzing Championships are in the form of a written test taken by individuals that is conducted at various points around the globe. Each competitor faces the same questions (translated into their mother tongue in many cases) at approximately the same time. There are 240 questions, divided into eight categories, and are given out in two packs of four papers. The contestants will be given sixty (60) minutes to answer each pack. Previously, the rule is that at the end of the allotted time, the papers are marked and each contestant's top seven category scores will be added together to find the winner. However, this rule was changed in 2022. Instead, all eight papers will be counted to determine the winner.

The genres and general content areas are a combination of academic and popular culture topics including:

However, there is a chance that a question will seem to fit into one, two, or even several genres.

List of WQC winners

By number of wins 
The table below shows the medalists from each year, along with the years that a player won the championship.

By year 
The table below shows the top-three placings from each year.

* The 2020 competition was largely contested online.

Competition history

2003 
A fledgling event was first staged by Quizzing.co.uk in 2003 at Villa Park football stadium, Birmingham, England. This saw 50 quizzers representing a handful of nations compete in a written test of quiz knowledge. The inaugural event was won by Olav Bjortomt. The event has full official status but only took place in one country and is sometimes erroneously omitted in statistics.

2004 
In 2004, following the foundation of the International Quizzing Association (IQA), the event was held simultaneously in five countries: the United Kingdom (joined by quizzers from elsewhere, including Ireland), Belgium (joined by quizzers from the Netherlands), Estonia, India, and Malaysia. Over 300 quizzers took part. The UK leg was staged at Manchester United's Old Trafford football stadium. The 2004 winner was Kevin Ashman.

 Kevin Ashman – 154
 Pat Gibson – 135
 Ashish – 128
 Nico Pattyn – 126
 Frank Van Nieuwenhove – 124
 Ian Bayley – 118
 David Stainer – 117
 Arul Mani – 116
 Stephen Pearson – 115
 Lauri Naber – 115

2005 
The 2005 championship on July 2, saw further significant growth with the event benefiting from the sponsorship of MSN Search.  Countries joining the original five competing nations included Australia, Finland, Indonesia, Norway and Singapore.  Quizzers sat eight papers of 30 questions each, covering: 'Culture', 'Entertainment', 'History', 'Lifestyle', 'Media', 'Sciences', 'Sport and Games', and 'World', with the lowest score from the eight genres being dropped – although these did come into play to settle tie-break situations.  The eight genres were won outright or shared by quizzers from seven countries (Belgium, England, Estonia, Finland, India, Ireland, and Norway).

Efforts to encourage the participation of women in the contest (competitive quizzing has hitherto been something of a male-dominated pastime) were rewarded in 2005 with a win for Trine Aalborg of Norway in the 'Lifestyle' category and a sixth place overall for Dorjana Širola of Croatia (who also finished 3rd among those competitors who had gathered at Silverstone motor racing circuit for the UK leg of the competition). In India, another woman, Debashree Mitra of Bangalore took 3rd place overall also.

 Kevin Ashman – 161
 Pat Gibson – 154
 Nico Pattyn – 151 
 Marc Van Springel – 144
 Arul Mani – 144
 Dorjana Širola – 139 (first woman)
 Ove Põder – 138
 Lauri Naber – 138
 Erik Derycke – 138
 Ian Bayley – 138

2006 
On June 3, 2006, the World Quizzing Championships were held at more than 15 locations. First time organisers were Lithuania, Germany, Switzerland, Liberia and Sri Lanka. People of a multitude of nationalities took part, including representatives from the United States, Australia, Russia, Singapore, Hungary, and France. The title was, for the 3rd year running, won by Kevin Ashman.

 Kevin Ashman – 166
 Pat Gibson – 163
 Nico Pattyn – 155
 Marc Van Springel – 146
 Olav Bjortomt – 142
 Ronny Swiggers – 140
 Dorjana Širola – 140 (highest placed woman)
 Mark Bytheway – 136
 Erik Derycke – 136
 Ian Bayley – 133

2007 
On June 2, 2007, the World Quizzing Championships was held at locations including the Netherlands, the US and Hungary for the first time. Pat Gibson took the crown from three-time winner Kevin Ashman.

 Pat Gibson – 179
 Kevin Ashman – 176
 Mark Bytheway – 171
 Olav Bjortomt – 164
 Jesse Honey – 159
 Ronny Swiggers – 158
 Ian Bayley – 151
 Mark Grant – 151
 Nico Pattyn – 150
 Arul Mani – 150
Dorjana Širola of Croatia was the highest placed woman in 12th position. Paul Paquet from Canada placed highest in the New York City leg, the first time the WQC was held in North America.

2008 
The 2008 World Quizzing Championships were held on June 7, 2008 at more than 30 locations, including for the first time Australia, the Philippines, Canada, China, Bangladesh, and Latvia. Mark Bytheway took the world title in a close race with Belgium's Ronny Swiggers and Finland's Tero Kalliolevo.

 Mark Bytheway – 173
 Ronny Swiggers – 172
 Tero Kalliolevo – 170
 Kevin Ashman – 167
 Pat Gibson – 165 
 Nico Pattyn – 163
 Olav Bjortomt – 155
 Ian Bayley – 154
 Jesse Honey – 152
 Dorjana Širola – 150  (best performing woman)

2009 
The 2009 World Quizzing Championships were held on June 6, 2009 at more than 45 locations, including 10 venues in the US, 9 in India and 4 in Russia. Kevin Ashman regained his title and became the first ever to win 4 World Quizzing Championships. Second again was Ronny Swiggers from Belgium. Third was last year's champion Mark Bytheway. Jeopardy! legend Jerome Vered, whose all-time single-day winnings record lasted 10 or 12 years (depending on whether adjustment for the doubling of the clue values is used), placed eighth.

 Kevin Ashman – 177
 Ronny Swiggers – 174
 Mark Bytheway – 166
 Olav Bjortomt – 165
 Nico Pattyn – 165 
 Pat Gibson – 164
 Tero Kalliolevo – 156
 Jerome Vered – 155
 Jesse Honey – 152
 Thomas Kolåsæter – 148

Dorjana Širola of Croatia was the highest placed woman in 22nd position with 135 points.

2010 
The 2010 World Quizzing Championships were held on June 5, 2010 at almost seventy locations, adding Armenia, Bulgaria, Morocco, and the Republic of Ireland for the first time. Over 1200 people participated. Five nations were represented among the competitors placed in the top 10 overall. The overall winner was Pat Gibson.

Dorjana Širola of Croatia was the highest placed woman in 17th position with 140 points.

2011 

The 2011 World Quizzing Championships took place on Saturday, June 4 with the planned addition of venues in Denmark, Gibraltar and Madagascar. Reigning champion Pat Gibson achieved the highest score in England with 186 and retained his title. Four times champion Kevin Ashman made 176. Tero Kalliolevo achieved the highest score in Finland with 176. Ronny Swiggers achieved the highest score in Belgium with 168. Steve Perry achieved the highest score in USA with 164. Mark Grant achieved the highest score in Wales with 163. Thomas Kolåsæter achieved the highest score in Norway with 158.

2012 
The 2012 event was held on June 2, 2012, with over 1,700 participants competing at 88 locations in 35 countries. Defending champion Pat Gibson was beaten into second place by Jesse Honey with a score of 186. For the first time ever, someone scored full marks in one genre with Ishaan Chugh, a quizzer from India, scoring 30/30 in the Media section.

2013 
The 2013 World Quizzing Championship took place on 1 June. A record 1,992 participants competed with India being the most represented country.

2014 
The 2014 World Quizzing Championship took place on 7 June with 1,833 participants.

2015 
The 2015 World Quizzing Championship took place on 6 June with over 2,000 participants.

2016 
The 2016 World Quizzing Championship took place on 4 June with over 2,500 participants.

2017

2018

2019

2020

2021

2022

See also 
 Australian Quiz Champion
 British Quizzing Championships
 European Quizzing Championships
 Asia-Pacific Quiz Championships

Notes

References

External links 
Official site
World Quizzing Championships 2007: Results
World Quizzing Championships 2006: Results
World Quizzing Championships 2005: Results
World Quizzing Championships 2004: Results
 IQA Belgium with full results previous World and European Championships
 IQA Great Britain
 IQA United States 
  IQA Norway – all WQC results
Quizzing Australia
 World Quizzing Championship in Lithuania – information, results, photos
World Quizzing Championship in Ireland – information, results, photos

Quiz games
Student quiz competitions
Trivia competitions
Recurring events established in 2003